Václav Bárta (born 27 October 1980), known as Václav Noid Bárta, is a Czech singer, songwriter, and actor.

He comes from an artistic family. His father is a writer and director, and his mother a singer. 
At age 17, he formed the Czech nu-metal group Dolores Clan and later on his musical band Noid Crew. He also appeared in local theatre and musical productions with acting and/or singing roles notably in Hamlet, Excalibur, Aida, Jesus Christ Superstar, Lucie, větší než malé množství lásky.

He released a number of singles as a solo artist and established his own music and video production house ParaNoid Studio.

Eurovision 2015 
He represented the Czech Republic in the Eurovision Song Contest 2015 along with Marta Jandová with the song "Hope Never Dies".

Personal life
In 2006, he married Czech pop singer Lucie Bílá, but they officially announced their separation on September 1, 2008. After well-publicized affair with beauty pageant and Czech Miss 2008 Eliška Bučková beginning 2010, the couple were engaged, but broke up in January 2013. Starting April 2013, he started dating model Gabriela Dvořáková. The couple officially married on 7 July 2014.

Actor 
He has appeared in a number of stage and musical local productions
Láska je láska (2009) - band leader 
Elixír života (2009)
Excalibur
Carmen (2012) - as García 
Obraz Doriana Greye 
Hamlet 
Jesus Christ Superstar 
Aida 
Lucie, větší než malé množství lásky

Films and television
Kájínek (2010) - as Křížek 
Svatby v Benátkách (2014-2015 Czech TV Series) - as Milánek

Composer / Soundtracks 
Nelítostně (2008)
Kajínek (2010) - song "Samota"
Němcová! (2010)
[Obchoďák (English title, "The Mall", 2012 Czech TV series) - song (composition and vocals) for "Když to nečekáš" 
Rány (2012)

Discography

Albums
Václav Noid Bárta (2013)

Singles
 "Hope Never Dies" (with Marta Jandová) (Eurovision Song Contest 2015 - official Czech Republic entry)

Videography
"Poušť" (26 November 2012)
"Moře kupodivů" (23 October 2013)
"Jedinej krok" (31 July 2014)

See also
Czech Republic in the Eurovision Song Contest 2015

References

External links

Eurovision Song Contest entrants of 2015
Eurovision Song Contest entrants for the Czech Republic
21st-century Czech male singers
Musicians from Prague
1980 births
Living people
Czech people of Slovak descent
Czech people of German descent